Department of Explosives is a Bangladesh government regulatory agency responsible for regulating commercial explosives in Bangladesh and is attached to the Ministry of Power, Energy and Mineral Resources.

History
Department of Explosives is a government department responsible for regulating commercial explosives and flammable material in Bangladesh. Its headquarters are in Dhaka but has regional offices in Barisal, Chittagong, Khulna, Rajshahi, and Sylhet. It establishment was based on the explosives act of 1884.

References

Organisations based in Dhaka
Government departments of Bangladesh
Government agencies of Bangladesh